Eucamptognathus minor is a species of ground beetle in the subfamily Pterostichinae. It was described by Harold in 1879.

References

Eucamptognathus
Beetles described in 1879